Danvers, D'Anvers or d'Anvers may refer to:

People
 Danvers (surname)
 Caleb D'Anvers, pseudonym of Nicholas Amhurst (1697–1742), English poet, political writer and editor of The Craftsman

Places

In Canada
 Danvers, Nova Scotia

In the United States
 Danvers, Illinois
 Danvers, Massachusetts
 Danvers State Hospital, in Danvers, Massachusetts
 Danvers, Minnesota
 Danvers, Montana

Art, entertainment, and media
 Dédée d'Anvers (1948), a French film

See also
 Danver, a fictional Colorado town in the 2002 American film Interstate 60